The  USCGC Hickory (WLB-212) is a United States Coast Guard seagoing buoy tender, home-ported in Homer, Alaska.  The Hickory serves multiple missions, including aids to navigation,  search and rescue, maritime law enforcement, marine environmental protection and homeland security. Because of her service to the Kenai Peninsula of Alaska, the Hickory has earned the nickname "The Kenai Keeper".

External links
CGC Hickory
Kingrey, Julia, (2 January 2008). A day in the life of the U.S. Coast Guard Hickory, Homer Tribune.

Ships of the United States Coast Guard
USCGC Hickory (WLB-212)
Juniper-class seagoing buoy tenders
2003 ships
Ships built by Marinette Marine